This list of botanical gardens and arboretums in Michigan is intended to include all significant botanical gardens and arboretums in the U.S. state of Michigan

See also
List of botanical gardens and arboretums in the United States

References 

 
Arboreta in Michigan
botanical gardens and arboretums in Michigan